Closer to You: The Pop Side is a compilation album by American jazz singer Cassandra Wilson, released in 2009.

Reception
Jeff Simon of The Buffalo News stated, "Bless her, Cassandra Wilson has always done this. Even when she was the Queen of Brooklyn's thorny M-Base jazz radicals a couple decades ago -- and not yet the greatest living jazz singer as she is now -- her discs would have one or two pop hits on them, interpreted in the most inimitable way... Call it ultra-smart marketing if you want but there's a lot of marvelous music here."

Track listing 
 "Love Is Blindness" (Bono, Adam Clayton, The Edge, Larry Mullen Jr.) — 4:54
 "Time After Time" (Rob Hyman, Cyndi Lauper) – 4:07
 "Fragile" (Sting) — 4:36
 "Closer to You" (Jakob Dylan) — 5:48
 "Last Train to Clarksville" (Tommy Boyce, Bobby Hart) — 5:16
 "The Weight" (Robbie Robertson) – 6:05
 "Tupelo Honey" (Van Morrison) - 5:37
 "Harvest Moon" (Neil Young) — 5:02
 "I Can't Stand the Rain" (Don Bryant, Bernard Miller, Ann Peebles) - 5:28
 "Lay Lady Lay" (Bob Dylan) — 5:08
 "Wichita Lineman" (Jimmy Webb) – 5:49

Chart performance

References 

Cassandra Wilson albums
2009 compilation albums
Covers albums
Pop compilation albums
Blue Note Records compilation albums